Chitrapur is a village in Bhatkal Taluka, Uttar Kannada District, Karnataka, India.
The religious headquarters of the Chitrapur Saraswat Brahmins, is in this town. The town, initially a small village was improved upon under the guidance of the Saraswat swamis. The small village of Chitrapur was built according to the idea of town-planning with a road in the middle and houses and gardens on both sides. It became a miniature municipality with street lamps lit during the night and roads swept clean. 
The mathadhipatis also constructed the Shiv-Ganga Sarovar at Chitrapur, the erection of a storeyed building at Panchavati, starting of schools for boys and girls. They helped build a post office with quarters for the post-master and a vegetable market at Chitrapur. 
The Chitrapur Math has many ancient Hindu statues in a museum.

See also
Saraswat Brahmins
Goud Saraswat Brahmins
Shirali
Chitrapur Math
Mangalore
Kokradi
Shenvi

Villages in Uttara Kannada district